Teresa Mary Clare Pollitt (born 1 January 1959) is an English musician who is best known as the bass guitarist for the punk rock band the Slits between 1976 and 1982.

Music career 
At 16 years old, Pollitt replaced the Slits's original bassist, Suzi Gutsy. The Slits disbanded in 1982 after the release of their second album, Return of the Giant Slits.

In the mid-2000s, Pollitt and Slits singer Ari Up reformed the band with new members, including singer Hollie Cook, guitarist Dr. No and drummer Anna Schulte. In 2006, the record label S.A.F. Records released an EP titled Revenge of the Killer Slits. The EP line-up included Paul Cook, formerly of the Sex Pistols, and Marco Pirroni, formerly of Adam and the Ants. In 2009, the Slits released the album ,Trapped Animal.

Personal life 
Pollitt married Sean Oliver and has a daughter with him. Oliver died in 1990 from sickle cell anemia. During the 1980s, Pollitt lived in Africa, on hiatus from the music industry.

References

English rock bass guitarists
1959 births
Living people
Musicians from London
Women bass guitarists
The Slits members
Women in punk